In finance, specifically in foreign exchange markets, a percentage in point or price interest point (pip) is a unit of change in an exchange rate of a currency pair.

The major currencies (except the Japanese yen) are traditionally priced to four decimal places, and a pip is one unit of the fourth decimal place: for dollar currencies this is to 1/100 of a cent. For the yen, a pip is one unit of the second decimal place, because the yen is much closer in value to one hundredth of other major currencies.

In the forward foreign exchange market, the time value adjustment made to the spot rate is quoted in pips, or FX points or forward points.

A pip is sometimes confused with the smallest unit of change in a quote, i.e. the tick size. Currency pairs are often quoted to four decimal places, but the tick size in a given market may be, for example, 5 pips or 1/2 pip.

Trading value 
A rate change of one pip may be related to the value change of a position in a currency market. A trading position of one lot that experiences a rate change of 1 pip therefore changes in value by 10 units of the quoted currency or other instrument.

Example
If the currency pair of the Euro and the U.S. Dollar (EUR/USD) is trading at an exchange rate of 1.3000 (1 EUR = 1.3 USD) and the rate changes to 1.3010, the price ratio increases by 10 pips.

Most retail trading by speculators is conducted in margin accounts, requiring only a small percentage (typically 1%) of the purchase price as equity for the transaction.
The Japanese Yen is an exception to this rule because of its worth against the US dollar being 0.01 

If the NZD/USD spot is trading at 0.8325 and the NZD/USD 1-year forward contract is traded at -270 pips, the outright 1-year forward is priced at 0.8055 (0.8325 - 0.0270).

Fractional pips
Electronic trading platforms have brought greater price transparency and price competition to the foreign exchange markets. Several trading platforms have extended the quote precision for most of the major currency pairs by an additional decimal point; the rates are displayed in 1/10 pip.

Table of pip values
The table portrays pip values for selected currencies as used by Fenics MD for their forward contracts or non-deliverable forwards.

See also

References

Foreign exchange market